The Tyrants in Therapy are an American "punk cabaret" band, which was formed in Los Angeles, California, United States, in 1983. Having started as a foursome, they have operated, since 1994, with only two members: songwriter, lead singer and producer Michael J; and songwriter and lead singer AbbeAbbe. Over the years, as they have experimented with different sounds, different line-ups and different labels, their music has been received with a mixture of enthusiasm and indifference. From 2001 to 2008, they wrote, produced and starred in a music and comedy television program, Meet The Tyrants in Therapy, which aired on Public-access television cable TV networks.

Band history 
The Tyrants in Therapy formed in late 1983, as a four-person band. The original members, who adopted nicknames, were: writer, songwriter, producer and former advertising copywriter Michael J (officially Michael Jaye); writer and actress AbbeAbbe (Abbe Kanter); songwriter, background vocalist, drum machine operator and art director Harol Glasscock (Carol Hannan); and songwriter, producer and keyboardist Charlie X (Charles Lamont).

For the first two years of their existence, the Tyrants in Therapy were financed by music publishers, who allowed them full rein for their creative impulses. The result was a collection of quirky songs such as At the Cowboy Lounge, Communist Reggae, Underground Girl of the World, and In The Shadow of Hitler, which were preoccupied with subjects like gay cowboys, dancing communists and whimsical fascists.

But the world did not embrace their ironic candor, and so when the band released its first record, the 12" EP 3 People Nude Below the Waist (featuring scratching by the Knights of the Turntables), in 1984, it flopped. On a dare, the Tyrants in Therapy released another 12-inch record dance single the following year, Paint it Pink (co-produced by Guy Roche), which got club play around the U.S.

The Tyrants' breakthrough occurred in 1986, with Too Tuff To Cry. The 12-inch single became a hit in Los Angeles’s Hi NRG underground, selling more than 100,000 copies in Southern California and Mexico, and propelling the Tyrants in Therapy into the thick of the national dance music scene.

For the next few years, the Tyrants in Therapy (as a band, as individuals, and in collaboration with others) continued to release a steady stream of 12-inch singles on various independent Los Angeles labels. Meanwhile, it maintained its unpredictable schedule, playing discos one night and punk and new wave rock clubs the next.

More success came in 1989, with the release of Big Pink House (written with Terry Shaddick), and then in 1996, with Boy, both of which received significant airplay on urban pop radio around the U.S.

After years of frustration with their labels, the Tyrants in Therapy formed their own imprint, Emotional Coathanger Records, in 2000. For a long time, they had felt that their artistic vision was being compromised, as the various labels with which they had associated had made them adopt an increasingly constrictive dance sound. Dismayed that they were being compelled to accept a format that de-emphasized lyrics and message, the Tyrants in Therapy finally assumed full control of the content, production, packaging and promotion of their music.

That same year, they released their first full-length album, Meet The Tyrants in Therapy, on their new label. Making use of samples and rhythms dating from the 1940s to the 1990s, blending genres such as rock, dance, punk, blues and cabaret, and addressing a dizzying array of topics such as human rights, suicide, lesbianism, pedophilia and cake, the tracks marked a move away from disco and into a style they dubbed “Punk Cabaret”.

In 2001, the Tyrants in Therapy shot the first episode of their television series, Meet The Tyrants in Therapy. In total, 22 were aired.

In 2009, they released their second full-length album, High Class Trash. Once again demonstrating the flair and originality for which they are renowned, the Tyrants brought their gifts for melody and irony to a variety of subjects: love, gender, sexuality, climate change, Hollywood and cowboys. It is as unashamedly devoid of political correctness as the rest of their work.

In 2010, the Tyrants released Dance with The Tyrants: Classic Dance Hits Vol. 1, a compilation of their hard-to-find dance singles.

In 2012, they returned to the international dance scene with Perfect Love, an EP that opened new territories for the group, including Eastern Europe and Latin America, and which landed at the #1 position on Top80 Radio in Warsaw.

In 2013, the Tyrants continued their dance music renaissance with two releases. The first was Dance with The Tyrants Vol. 2: The Original 12” Extended Club Mixes. The second was Once Upon A Time, a track produced with Greek DJ/producer Thomas Bainas, and which married the Tyrants’ romantic side with anti-war politics.

Personnel 
Although the Tyrants in Therapy formed in 1983, the first association of the four founding members came in 1977, when Michael J and AbbeAbbe met during an improvisational acting class they were taking in Hollywood. They started dating, before marrying the following year. The next association occurred in 1981, when the couple began writing songs with Charlie X, who had been introduced to them by Jim Callon, the owner of JDC Records and an old college friend of Michael J’s. Glasscock then came on the scene in 1983, after she joined the Beverly Hills advertising agency where Michael J worked.

At AbbeAbbe’s suggestion, the foursome decided to name themselves the Tyrants in Therapy, and started performing in Los Angeles rock clubs. Besides The Troubadour, none of these clubs- Club 88, Al's Bar, Club Lingerie, Cathay de Grande, Madame Wong’s East and West, Vertigo, The Central, the FM Station, and the Mannikin (in San Diego)- still exist.

Almost immediately, the Tyrants in Therapy were reduced to a trio, as Charlie X, a working lounge musician, balked at playing for little or no money. In 1985, Glasscock left the band as well, in order to focus on her advertising career. Glasscock was replaced by background vocalist Maureen Mahon, but for the next few years, the position of ‘third Tyrant’ was to become something of a revolving door. Mahon departed after six months due to artistic differences, and her replacement, Anni Celsi, lasted even less time, being fired in 1986 due to attitude problems and  her inability to vocally complement AbbeAbbe. Celsi was replaced by Brenda X (Brenda Lavin), but she was deemed to be temperamentally unsuited to the rock and gay clubs in which the Tyrants in Therapy gigged, and in 1986, was asked to leave. Artistic differences led to Stina Hokenson leaving the band in 1987, while her replacement, songwriter and co-lead vocalist Stacy Dunne, left of her own accord the following year when she moved to Nashville. Keyboardist and songwriter Jeff Bennett (grandson of Boyd Bennett) came on the scene in 1991, and in 1993 was joined for a few months by another keyboardist, Marcy Szrama. However, the 2 keyboardist format proved unwieldy, and Szrama was gone by year’s end. In 1994, Bennett also left, in order to pursue his musical studies at CSUN. The last person to fill the position of third Tyrant was songwriter, guitarist and background vocalist Andi Ostrowe; she also lasted just a handful of gigs, before personal problems compelled her to quit in 1994. At that point, Michael J and AbbeAbbe decided to keep the Tyrants in Therapy as a duo.

Discography 
The Tyrants in Therapy have released two studio albums, one EP and seven singles. As well, their material has appeared on various dance compilations and bootlegs over the years.

Television 
Meet The Tyrants in Therapy was a half-hour comedy and variety show, combining humour and political satire with original Tyrants in Therapy music. From 2001 to 2008, the Tyrants in Therapy wrote, produced, co-directed, edited and starred in 25 episodes, which aired on several Public-access television cable TV networks (including AT&T, Adelphia, Comcast, Charter and Time Warner) in the greater Los Angeles area. Meet The Tyrants in Therapy is currently being broadcast on the Manhattan Neighborhood Network's Lifestyle Channel every Sunday night at midnight (Eastern Standard Time).

The Tyrants in Therapy’s first recording experience occurred in Adelphia Cable’s Van Nuys Public-access television studio, after AbbeAbbe had suggested that shooting some lip sync footage from the Meet The Tyrants in Therapy studio album might help them secure a new booking agent. The results, although very rough, were encouraging enough to convince the Tyrants in Therapy to book more studio time. This material then became the basis for the Meet The Tyrants in Therapy television program.

At first, the Tyrants in Therapy directed themselves, but for the third episode, director/choreographer Ceil Gruessing, a friend of AbbeAbbe’s from Antioch College, was enlisted to direct. While problems were encountered with sound, lighting and framing, the Tyrants in Therapy persevered, and went on to work with several other stage directors, including Debra De Liso, Steven Memel, Betsey Cassell, Tanya Kane-Parry and Tracy Winters. And when none of them were available, the Tyrants in Therapy reclaimed sole charge of the directing.

Beginning from episode one, the veteran radio personality and DJ Pierre Gonneau, who had acted as a booking agent for the Tyrants in Therapy during their disco years, became the program’s first host. Known as ‘Lucky Pierre’, his silver hair and resonant French-accented baritone lent him a distinguished air, and allowed him to act the foil to the younger and more vibrant Tyrants in Therapy. However, due to health reasons, he was forced to retire from the program in 2005.

On De Liso’s recommendation, Gonneau was replaced by the versatile character actor Time Winters, who premiered in the episode Sleeping Olympics. Starring as Dr Theodore von Dongle, he brings an effete brand of Anglophilia to proceedings. His wife, the aforementioned Tracy Winters, is also part of the cast. She plays the role of Louise LaFaux, an uppity and libidinous real estate agent, from whom the Tyrants in Therapy buy a $10 million mansion.

Two other cast members are Jennifer Taub and Jaxon Duff Gwillim, who are married in real life, and who portray the wedded Shelley and Sheldon Schlumpmeister, a couple of nouveaux riche loudmouths. (Gwillim also occupies the role of Timothy von Dongle, the substitute host.) Czech character actor Oto Brezina has the recurring role of Dr Cabeza, the Tyrants in Therapy’s thick but persistent Buenos Aires-based psychiatrist. Finally, there is the versatile John Voldstad, an old friend of AbbeAbbe’s from high school, who has filled a variety of roles in Meet The Tyrants in Therapy.

Since 2006, the Tyrants in Therapy have been posting excerpts from the program (as well as songs and short films) on the video sites YouTube, Veoh, Metacafe, Dailymotion and Funny or Die.

In 2007, Meet The Tyrants in Therapy won the West Hollywood Public-access television “Best Outside Program” award.

References 

American public access television shows
American dance music groups
Musical groups from Los Angeles
Punk rock groups from California